This page gives a brief summary of the management of The Standard Life Assurance Company (1825-2017).

References 

Mutual insurance companies
History of insurance
Pensions in the United Kingdom
People associated with Edinburgh
Financial services companies established in 1825
Life insurance companies of the United Kingdom
Actuaries
Scottish businesspeople